Monte Cristi National Park (Parque National Monte Cristi) is a national park on the Caribbean Island of Hispaniola that extends from the borders of Haiti to Punta Rucia in the Dominican Republic and covers an area of 550 km². It contains coastal lagoons, beaches, mangrove swamps, a 237 m (777 ft) limestone mesa from which can be seen offshore keys and forested slopes of the mesa's northern side.

The area is very dry, receiving just over two inches of rain per year. The huge mesa provides a habitat for an indigenous plant species called sabia montecristini as well as several reptile species. There are no marked paths in the park.

See also
List of national parks of Dominican Republic
Monte Cristi Pipe Wreck

Footnotes

External links
Monte Cristi Shipwreck Project - The 2001 Excavation
The Rhenish Stoneware from the Monte Cristi Shipwreck, Dominican Republic

National parks of the Dominican Republic
Geography of Monte Cristi Province
Tourist attractions in Monte Cristi Province